Hamadou Konaté is a Malian politician. He served as the Malian Minister of National Unity and Humanitarian Action. He is married to Suzanne Konaté Maïga, a public health administrator who served as secretary of state for social action and the promotion of women.

References

Living people
Government ministers of Mali
Year of birth missing (living people)
Place of birth missing (living people)
21st-century Malian people